The canton of Riom is an administrative division of the Puy-de-Dôme department, central France. It was created at the French canton reorganisation which came into effect in March 2015. Its seat is in Riom.

Composition

It consists of the following communes:
Chambaron-sur-Morge
Le Cheix
Pessat-Villeneuve
Riom
Saint-Bonnet-près-Riom

Councillors

Pictures of the canton

References

Cantons of Puy-de-Dôme